The 1994 Jeux de la Francophonie, also known as IIes Jeux de la Francophonie, (French for Francophone Games) were held in Paris/Évry-Bondoufle, France from July 5–13, 1994.

Sports

Medals & Participation
 Total

The following participation nations didn't win any medal.

External links
 Medal winners 1994 at jeux.francophonie.org 
 Medal tables at jeux.francophonie.org 

 
Jeux
International sports competitions hosted by France
Jeux de la Francophonie
Jeux
Multi-sport events in France